Bradley-Bourbonnais Community High School is a comprehensive public four-year high school located in Bradley, Illinois. It is the only school in District 307. As of 2020 the school has an enrollment of 2,026 students. Bradley Bourbonnais offers a variety of AP classes. It serves the communities of Bradley, Bourbonnais, a portion of Kankakee as well as surrounding unincorporated areas. Its feeder districts are Bradley (61), Bourbonnais (53) and St. George (258) school districts.

The student body is 71% White, 12% Hispanic, 11% Black, 2% Asian, 4% two or more races, 0.1% American Indian, and 0% Hawaiian Native/Pacific Islander. 29% of students are minorities. 37% of students were eligible for the Free Lunch Program and 6% for the Reduced-Price Lunch Program.

About 900 students participate in interscholastic sports. The Bradley-Bourbonnais Boilermakers compete in the Southwest Suburban Conference and the Illinois High School Association. Sixty competitive teams in 24 sports. The Superintendent is Dr. Matthew Vosberg.

In 2020, U.S. News & World Report considered Bradley-Bourbonnais a silver level high school.

Athletics 
The Athletic Director is Mike Kohl.

Bradley-Bourbonnais competes as a member of the Southwest Suburban Conference. The school is also member of the Illinois High School Association (IHSA), which governs most athletics and competitive activities in  the State of Illinois. Teams are named the "Boilermakers". 

The school sponsors interscholastic teams for young men and women in Basketball, Bowling, Cross Country, Golf, Soccer (coed), Swimming, Tennis, Track, Volleyball, and Water Polo. Young women may compete in Badminton, Cheerleading, Dance, Softball, and Volleyball, while young men may also compete in Baseball, Football, and Wrestling.

Activities and Clubs 

 Art Club
 Best Buddies
 Chess Club
 Drama Club
 Ecology Club
 French Club
 Gay-Straight Alliance (GSA)
 Leo's Club
 Literary Magazine
 Mathletes
 National Art Honor Society (NAHS)
 National Honor Society (NHS)
 Natural Helpers
 Red Surge
 Robotics
 SADD (Students Against Destructive Decisions)
 Scholastic Bowl
 Spanish Club
 Speech Team
 Student Council
 SWSC Science
 Theater
 Tri-M Music Honor Society
 Youth and Government

Facilities 
BB facilities include 96 classrooms, three gymnasiums, an Olympic-sized pool, a weight room and fitness center, a community center, a 600-seat theater, and 1:1 Google chromebook laptops.

Notable alumni
Tom Prince,
MLB Pro Baseball Player 
Jason Buhrmester, author/journalist
Colin Holderman, baseball player

References 

Schools in Kankakee County, Illinois
Public high schools in Illinois